Patterson is a city in Pierce County, Georgia, United States. The population was 730 at the 2010 census.

History
Patterson was named after William Paterson, the proprietor of a local sawmill. The Georgia General Assembly incorporated Patterson in 1893.

Geography

Demographics

Patterson is part of the Waycross Micropolitan Statistical Area.

2020 census

As of the 2020 United States census, there were 749 people, 311 households, and 168 families residing in the city.

2000 census
As of the census of 2000, there were 627 people, 264 households, and 180 families residing in the city. The racial makeup of the city was 70.49% White, 28.23% African American, 0.32% Native American, 0.64% Asian, and 0.32% from two or more races. Hispanic or Latino of any race were 0.64% of the population.

There were 264 households, out of which 26.1% had children under the age of 18 living with them, 52.7% were married couples living together, 12.1% had a female householder with no husband present, and 31.8% were non-families. 31.1% of all households were made up of individuals, and 18.6% had someone living alone who was 65 years of age or older.  The average household size was 2.38 and the average family size was 2.98.

In the city, the population was spread out, with 24.1% under the age of 18, 7.7% from 18 to 24, 23.3% from 25 to 44, 25.4% from 45 to 64, and 19.6% who were 65 years of age or older.  The median age was 42 years. For every 100 females, there were 77.6 males.  For every 100 females age 18 and over, there were 78.9 males.

The median income for a household in the city was $26,591, and the median income for a family was $33,750. Males had a median income of $33,125 versus $20,938 for females. The per capita income for the city was $14,968.  About 14.2% of families and 17.6% of the population were below the poverty line, including 21.4% of those under age 18 and 28.7% of those age 65 or over.

Climate
The climate in this area is characterized by relatively high temperatures and evenly distributed precipitation throughout the year.  According to the Köppen Climate Classification system, Patterson has a humid subtropical climate, abbreviated "Cfa" on climate maps.

Notable people
KaDee Strickland, actress (b. 1975) Born in Blackshear but she grew up in Patterson and went to school in Pierce County. Her successful acting career includes a starring role in the television series Private Practice.
Lindsay Thomas, Congressman born in Patterson.

References

Cities in Georgia (U.S. state)
Cities in Pierce County, Georgia
Waycross, Georgia micropolitan area